Vlatko Nedelkov (born July 13, 1985) is a former Macedonian professional basketball Guard who played for Žito Vardar, AMAK SP, Feni Industries and Borec Veles.

References

External links
 Eurobasket Profile
 BGBasket Profile
 BubaBasket Profile

1985 births
Living people
Macedonian men's basketball players
Guards (basketball)
Place of birth missing (living people)